The discography of Sauce Money, an American rapper from New York, is composed of one studio album, three singles and numerous guest appearances.

Albums

Studio albums

Singles

Guest appearances

References 

Discographies of American artists
Hip hop discographies